Vũ Anh Tuấn (born September 15, 1987) is a Vietnamese footballer who is a midfielder .

References

External links 

1987 births
Living people
Vietnamese footballers
Vietnam international footballers
V.League 1 players
Hoang Anh Gia Lai FC players
Dong Thap FC players
Can Tho FC players
Quang Nam FC players
People from Gia Lai Province
Association football midfielders